Robinsonia  is a genus of plants in the groundsel tribe within the sunflower family.

 Species
All the species are endemic to the Juan Fernández Islands in the Pacific Ocean, part of the Republic of Chile. The genus is named for the fictional character Robinson Crusoe, purportedly shipwrecked in this chain of islands.

References

Senecioneae
Asteraceae genera
Flora of the Juan Fernández Islands